A Song for You is the second official single released by South Korean singer, Roh Ji-hoon. The song was released digitally on February 4, 2014.

Background
On May 27, 2013, Cube Entertainment's CEO Hong Seung-sung released a letter on Cube Entertainment's official website regarding the plans of Cubes' artists and mentioned that Roh Ji-hoon will release a new song soon and has been preparing his new release. On February 3, 2014, the official music video of A Song for You was uploaded onto Cube Entertainment's official YouTube channel and the single was released digitally the next day. A Song For You was written and composed by Roh Ji-hoon himself with writer and producer Gen Neo from NoizeBank and also features Shorry J from Mighty Mouth.

Promotion
On February 6, 2014, Roh Ji-hoon began promotional appearances on Mnet's M! Countdown as well as other various music programs.

Track list

Chart performance

References

External links
Roh Ji-hoon Profile on Cube Entertainment

Cube Entertainment singles
2014 singles
Korean-language songs
2014 songs